Chrysanthemic acid is an organic compound that is related to a variety of natural and synthetic insecticides.   It is related to the pyrethrin I and II, as well as the pyrethroids. One of the four stereoisomers, (1R,3R)- or (+)-trans-chrysanthemic acid (pictured), is the acid part of the ester pyrethrin I, which occurs naturally in the seed cases of Chrysanthemum cinerariaefolium. Many synthetic pyrethroids, for example the allethrins, are esters of all four stereoisomers. Staudinger and Ružička named chrysanthemic acid in 1924.

Biosynthesis
Chrysanthemic acid is derived from its pyrophosphate ester, which in turn is produced naturally from two molecules of dimethylallyl diphosphate.

Industrial synthesis 
Chrysanthemic acid is produced industrially in a cyclopropanation reaction of a diene as a mixture of cis- and trans isomers, followed by hydrolysis of the ester:

Many pyrethroids are accessible by re-esterification of chrysanthemic acid ethylester.

References 

Monoterpenes
Cyclopropanes
Carboxylic acids